The Talkeetna Airstrip is a historic runway in Talkeetna, Alaska. It is a rectangular area of land, covered by grass and gravel, extending southward along D Street from First Street toward the Susitna River. The airstrip was created in 1940 as the result of a presidential executive order issued by President Franklin Delano Roosevelt in 1937, which set aside federal land near Talkeetna for aviation-related purposes. It played a major role in the economic development of the community, as air transport was the most reliable method of bringing supplies and travelers into the area.

The airstrip was listed on the National Register of Historic Places in 2002, at which time it was still occasionally used for aviation.  Most aviation now uses the state-owned Talkeetna Airport, located east of the village center.

See also
National Register of Historic Places listings in Matanuska-Susitna Borough, Alaska

References

Airports in Matanuska-Susitna Borough, Alaska
Airports on the National Register of Historic Places
Buildings and structures on the National Register of Historic Places in Matanuska-Susitna Borough, Alaska
Transportation buildings and structures on the National Register of Historic Places in Alaska